La France profonde ("Deep France") is a phrase that denotes the existence of "deep" and profoundly "French" aspects of the culture of French provincial towns, of French village life and rural agricultural culture, which escape the "dominant ideologies" (Michel Dion's expression) and the hegemony of Paris. It was made familiar to English readers in Michel Dion's radical critique, La France profonde, predicting a union of de-Communised socialism with a reformed Catholic Church. France profonde was popularized in Celia Brayfield's  Deep France: A Writer's Year in La France profonde (2004) retitled in paperback Deep France: A Writer's Year in the Béarn.

"Deep France" is seen to be profoundly localist in outlook and to be receding in the face of international mass culture.

Albert Kahn's photographic and cinematographic studies at the beginning of the 20th century possibly for the first time helped depict French provincial life and in doing so gave some vision into France profonde.

See also
Pure laine
Deep England
Deep South
Middle America
The Discovery of France
Heartland (United States)

French culture
French nationalism
Localism (politics)
Romantic nationalism
French words and phrases